Busia is a town in Kenya. It is the capital and largest town of Busia County.

Location
This location is immediately east of Busia, Uganda. The coordinates of Busia, Kenya are: 00°27'48.0"N, 34°06'19.0"E (Latitude:0.463333; Longitude:34.105278).

Overview
The towns of Busia, Kenya and Busia, Uganda are very busy border towns on Kenya's border with Uganda.

It is expected that in May 2016, the construction of a one-stop-border-crossing between Busia, Kenya and Busia, Uganda will conclude. The construction on the Uganda side was completed in May 2016, and that on the Kenya side concluded in July 2017. The common upgraded border crossing is expected to be commissioned on Saturday 24 February 2018, jointly by presidents Uhuru Kenyatta of Kenya and Yoweri Museveni of Uganda.

In 2021 it was reported that large quantities of Ugandan sugar were being smuggled into Kenya through Busia. Sugar in Kenya was more expensive but the failure of Kenyan sugar production meant that sugar could achieve an even high price.

Population
The 2009 Kenyan census recorded Busia's population as 51,981.

Education
Local Catherine Omanyo moved the school she founded, now named "International School for Champions", here after unrest in Nairobi in 2007.

See also
Busia District, Uganda

References

Busia County
Cities in the Great Rift Valley
Kenya–Uganda border crossings
County capitals in Kenya
Populated places in Western Province (Kenya)